Bedelands Farm Nature Reserve is a   Local Nature Reserve on the northern outskirts of Burgess Hill in West Sussex. It is owned and managed by Mid Sussex District Council.

The farm has woodland, wildflower meadows, grazed meadows, wetland and ancient hedgerows. The woodland has ancient hornbeams and wild service trees, while wildflowers include the yellow rattle.

There is access from Maple Drive.

References

Local Nature Reserves in West Sussex